Thomas Patrick Moore (1872–1934) was an Argentine football player, most recognised for his tenure on Lobos Athletic Club.

Career 
Moore was born in Marcos Paz, Buenos Aires, the son of a family of Irish roots. He began his career in Lobos, club of which he was founder and the first Captain of the team in 1892. Moore came out twice Runner-up playing for Lobos in 1898 and 1899. Both finals were played against Lomas Athletic Club.

His brothers the twins Juan Jose and Eugenio Moore were part of the Lobos team. Later, were players of the Alumni Athletic Club.

References

External links 
familysearch.org

Argentine footballers
Footballers from Buenos Aires
Argentine people of Irish descent
1872 births
1934 deaths
Association footballers not categorized by position
Río de la Plata